Oxyodes is a genus of moths of the family Noctuidae erected by Achille Guenée in 1852.

Description
Palpi upturned and smoothly scaled, where the second joint reaching vertex of head. Third joint long. Antennae almost simple. Thorax and abdomen smoothly scaled and somewhat slender. Tibia spineless. Fore tibia hairy. Forewings with produced and acute apex. Outer margin slightly excised and crenulate cilia.

Species
 Oxyodes scrobiculata (Fabricius, 1775)
 Oxyodes tricolor Guenée, 1852

References

 
 
 

Calpinae
Moth genera